The 2001–02 Rochdale A.F.C. season was the club's 81st season in the Football League, and the 28th consecutive season in the fourth tier (League Division Three).

Statistics
																												
																												

																												
|}

Competitions

Football League Third Division

Play-Offs

FA Cup

Football League Cup (Worthington Cup)

Football League Trophy (LDV Vans Trophy)

References

Rochdale A.F.C. seasons
2001–02 Football League Third Division by team